Johnston Hall is a historic building located on the campus of Elon University in Elon, Alamance County, North Carolina.  It was built in 1925, and is a substantial,
two-story, "H"-shaped, red brick Classical Revival style building. The front facade features a one-story flat-roof porch carried by brick piers. The building is the historical centerpiece of the Elon Homes for Children campus, an orphanage founded in 1907. The building is named for Charles David Johnston, superintendent of the orphanage.

The building was acquired by Elon University in 2003. It now serves as the headquarters for Elon University's Office of University Advancement. 

It was added to the National Register of Historic Places in 1994.

References

University and college buildings on the National Register of Historic Places in North Carolina
Buildings and structures in Alamance County, North Carolina
Neoclassical architecture in North Carolina
School buildings completed in 1925
Elon University
National Register of Historic Places in Alamance County, North Carolina
1925 establishments in North Carolina